Taylor Browning Widener (born October 24, 1994) is an American professional baseball pitcher for the NC Dinos of the KBO League. He pitched in Major League Baseball for the Arizona Diamondbacks from 2020 to 2022.

Career

Amateur career
Widener attended South Aiken High School in Aiken, South Carolina and played college baseball at the University of South Carolina. He was both a starter and relief pitcher at South Carolina. After his junior season, he was drafted by the New York Yankees in the 12th round of the 2016 Major League Baseball draft.

New York Yankees
Widener made his professional debut with the Staten Island Yankees and was promoted to the Charleston RiverDogs after not allowing a run over  innings with Staten Island. He finished 2016 with a combined 3–0 record and a 0.47 ERA in  innings pitched between both clubs. Widener spent 2017 with the Tampa Yankees where he posted a 7–8 record with a 3.39 ERA in 27 starts.

Arizona Diamondbacks
On February 18, 2018, the Yankees sent Widener to the Arizona Diamondbacks in a three-team trade, in which the Yankees acquired Brandon Drury from the Diamondbacks, the Diamondbacks acquired Steven Souza from the Tampa Bay Rays, and the Rays acquired Nick Solak from the Yankees and Anthony Banda and two PTBNL (Colin Poche and Sam McWilliams) from the Diamondbacks. Widener spent 2018 with the Jackson Generals, pitching to a 5–8 record with a 2.75 ERA in 26 games (25 starts). He spent 2019 with the Triple-A Reno Aces, going 6–7 with an 8.10 ERA over 23 starts, striking out 109 over 100 innings.

Widener was added to the Diamondbacks 40–man roster following the 2019 season. Widener made his major league debut on July 25, 2020, against the San Diego Padres, pitching  scoreless innings. On the season, he was 0-1 in 12 games with 22 strikeouts in 20 innings, he also induced 12 walks. In 2021, Widener made 23 appearances (13 starts) for Arizona, posting a 4.35 ERA with 73 strikeouts in  innings pitched.

In 2022, Widener pitched in 14 games with the big league club, recording a 3.63 ERA with 14 strikeouts in  innings pitched. He was designated for assignment on December 23, 2022. On January 5, 2023, Widener was sent outright to Triple-A Reno.

NC Dinos
On January 31, 2023, Widener signed a one-year contract worth $743,000 with the NC Dinos of the KBO League.

References

External links

South Carolina Gamecocks bio

1994 births
Living people
Sportspeople from Aiken, South Carolina
Baseball players from South Carolina
Major League Baseball pitchers
Arizona Diamondbacks players
South Carolina Gamecocks baseball players
Staten Island Yankees players
Charleston RiverDogs players
Tampa Yankees players
Jackson Generals (Southern League) players
Reno Aces players